Gail Strickland is an American actress who had prominent supporting roles in such films as  (1975), Bound for Glory (1976), Who'll Stop the Rain (1978), Norma Rae (1979), and Protocol (1984), and appeared regularly on various network television shows.

Life and career

Strickland was born in Birmingham, Alabama, one of five children, to Theodosia and Lynn Strickland, who owned a large tire dealership.  She married Neil Baker, and they have a daughter together named Maisy.

In 1973, Strickland appeared as Sister Ann in the season-four episode, "Almost a Nun's Story", on The Mary Tyler Moore Show. She had a memorable appearance on the television series M*A*S*H as Captain Helen Whitfield, a nurse in an ongoing battle with alcoholism. She appeared as Courtney, Jerry's love interest, in the episodes titled "Jerry Robinson Crusoe" (3.13) and “My Boy Guillermo” (4.19) of The Bob Newhart Show. She appeared in the pilot episode of the television series Night Court as the public defender. She also guest-starred in the Cagney & Lacey episode "Suffer the Children" season one, episode four. Strickland played a struggling rancher's daughter in the 1987 Highway to Heaven episode "A Dream of Wild Horses", alongside legendary actor Richard Farnsworth. She played nurse practitioner Marilyn McGrath in the 1988 TV series HeartBeat. This was one of the earliest portrayals of a lesbian character on American network television.

Strickland appeared in 11 episodes of Dr. Quinn, Medicine Woman from 1993–94 as the character Olive Davis. She guest-starred in the Star Trek: Deep Space Nine episode "Paradise", as the character Alixus. In 1994-95, she appeared as Mrs. Landis of Doubleday in the Seinfeld season-six episodes "The Chaperone" and "The Switch". She appeared on the U.S. Navy series JAG first-season episode "War Crimes" as Ambassador Bartlett, the U.S. ambassador to Peru. Strickland also played Esther MacInerney, the wife of A.J. MacInerney (Martin Sheen), chief of staff for President Andrew Shepherd (Michael Douglas), in the 1995 movie The American President. She played Dr. Rene Spielman on ER season six, episode six, "The Peace of Wild Things".

Strickland was a cast member in the brief run of the 2002 CBS television series First Monday, playing a Supreme Court justice.

Filmography

Film

Television

References

External links

American film actresses
American television actresses
Living people
Actresses from Birmingham, Alabama
20th-century American actresses
21st-century American actresses
Year of birth missing (living people)